Bumbuna II Hydroelectric Power Station is a planned  hydroelectric power station in Sierra Leone. The power plant is under development by a consortium of renewable energy IPPs and investors, led by Joule Africa Limited. The energy generated here will be sold to Electricity Distribution and Supply Authority (EDSA), the electricity utility company of Sierra Leone, under a 25-year power purchase agreement.

Location
The power station would be located across the Seli River (Rokel River), outside the town of Bumbuna, in Tonkolili District, in the Northern Province of Sierra Leone. Bumbuna II will be an extension of Bumbuna I, with similar geographical coordinates at 9°04'19.0"N, 11°43'21.0"W (Latitude:09.071944; Longitude:-11.722500).

Overview
Bumbuna I Hydropower Station is a 50 megawatt installation owned by the government of Sierra Leone. The power station which cost US$327 million to build, was commissioned in 2009. However its output is not enough to meet the country's electricity needs.

The new plan is to build a new power station (Bumbuna II), with capacity of 143 megawatts, adjacent to the first one with capacity of 50 megawatts (Bumbuna I).

Two Francis-type turbines each rated at 42.15 megawatts and one 3.7 megawatts turbine will be installed here for a total of 88 megawatts in new capacity.

It will be a "roller compacted concrete (RCC) gravity dam", creating a lake
The powerhouse at Yiben will have two Francis turbines each rated at 27.7 megawatts installed for a total of 55.4 megawatts in new capacity.

Ownership
Bumbuna II, with new generation capacity of 143.4 megawatts, is owned and will be developed, operated and maintained by Seli Hydropower Limited (SHPL). SHPL is a joint venture between Joule Africa, a renewable energy IPP headquartered in London, United Kingdom  and Energy Services Company (ESCO), based in Freetown, Sierra Leone.

Construction, funding and timeline
The construction budget is quoted at US$750 million. Funding sources include (a) the African Development Bank (AfDB) (b) the European Commission (EC), through the Electrification Financing Initiative (ElectriFI) (c) Private Infrastructure Development Group (PIDG) and (d) Emerging Africa Infrastructure Fund (EAIF).

Other considerations

It enters the national grid there.

See also
 List of power stations in Sierra Leone
 Bumbuna Dam

References

External links
 Profile of Bumbuna I & Bumbuna II Hydropower Stations

Hydroelectric power stations in Sierra Leone
Northern Province, Sierra Leone
Dams in Sierra Leone
Proposed hydroelectric power stations
Proposed renewable energy power stations in Sierra Leone